The George Washington Denton House is a historic home located in the Incorporated Village of Flower Hill, in Nassau County, on Long Island, in New York, United States. It was built sometime between 1873 and 1875. It was listed on the National Register of Historic Places in 1985.

Description 
The home is a rectangular, 2-story wood-frame building with a two-stage rear service ell in a vernacular Italian Villa style. It features a -story engaged tower, semi-octagonal bay windows, and an "L" shaped wraparound verandah.

Also on the property is a brick ice house built into the side of a hill.

The Long Island Rail Road's 1877 guidebook, "Long Island & Where to Go", made mention of this home. The George Washington Denton House is one of four places of interest in Roslyn mentioned in this publication.

The home is also featured in the Roslyn Landmark Society's 1986 house tour guide, on pages 414 - 423.

See also 

 The Sands-Willets Homestead - Another historic house located within the Village of Flower Hill.

References

External links
1986 Roslyn Landmark Society House Tour Guide
Roslyn Landmark Society George Washington Denton House profile
Old House Dreams 

Flower Hill, New York
Houses on the National Register of Historic Places in New York (state)
Italianate architecture in New York (state)
Houses completed in 1873
Houses in Nassau County, New York
National Register of Historic Places in North Hempstead (town), New York